Bernice Ruth Lapp (September 11, 1917 – September 8, 2010), also known by her married name Bernice Squier, was an American competition swimmer who represented the United States at the 1936 Summer Olympics in Berlin.  Lapp won a bronze medal as a member of the third-place U.S. team in the women's 4×100-meter freestyle relay.  Individually, she also competed in the semifinals of the women's 100-meter freestyle.

See also
 List of Olympic medalists in swimming (women)

External links
 
 Bernice Lapp's obituary

1917 births
2010 deaths
American female freestyle swimmers
Olympic bronze medalists for the United States in swimming
Swimmers at the 1936 Summer Olympics
Medalists at the 1936 Summer Olympics
21st-century American women